Father of the Bride is an American sitcom that aired on CBS during the 1961–62 season. Produced by MGM Television, the series was based on the 1950 film of the same title.  Cast members include Leon Ames as the father of the bride, Ruth Warrick as the mother, and Myrna Fahey as the bride.

Cast
 Leon Ames as Stanley Banks
 Ruth Warrick as Eleanor "Ellie" Banks
 Myrna Fahey as Katherine "Kay" Banks Dunston
 Ruby Dandridge as Delilah
 Burt Metcalfe as Buckley Dunston
 Ransom Sherman as Herbert Dunston
 Rickie Sorensen as Thomas "Tommy" Banks
 Lurene Tuttle as Doris Dunston

Episodes

External links
 

Father of the Bride (franchise)
1960s American sitcoms
1961 American television series debuts
1962 American television series endings
Black-and-white American television shows
CBS original programming
English-language television shows
Live action television shows based on films
Television series by MGM Television
Wedding television shows